The 2008 International Rally of Canberra was the second Round on the Australian Rally Championship calendar. The 2008 version of the Rally once again saw competitors from the Asia-Pacific Rally Championship, the Australian Rally Championship and the local Rally Championship in the Australian Capital Territory (PCD Engineering ACT Regional Rally Series). A total of 62 competitors started the Rally.

The results

The race was once again held around the Nation's Capital. The gravel roads surrounding the city were once again utilized in the race. A total of 48 cars (not including the local Rally series competing alongside the 2 main competitions) competed across the 18 stages of the Rally. One special note is that the 2008 British Rally Championship Winner, Guy Wilks also competed in this year's Rally.

References

Rally competitions in Australia
International Rally of Canberra
Canberra